The United States occupation of Veracruz (April 21 to November 23, 1914) began with the Battle of Veracruz and lasted for seven months. The incident came in the midst of poor diplomatic relations between Mexico and the United States, and was related to the ongoing Mexican Revolution.

The occupation was a response to the Tampico Affair of April 9, 1914, where Mexican forces had detained nine American sailors. The occupation further worsened relations, and led to widespread anti-Americanism in Mexico.

Background

US-Mexico relations were strained by the Mexican-American war. The expansionist policies of U.S. president James K. Polk, combined with the Mexican government's desire to retain control of Texas and Upper California, led to the outbreak of military conflict between the US and Mexico in 1846. The decisive US victory led to Mexico ceding 55% of its territory to the United States and a sense of animosity developing between the two nations.

US-Mexico relations improved during Abraham Lincoln's presidency. He provided military aid in the form of supplies for the Mexican government during their war against French occupation. Porfirio Diaz, head of state of Mexico from 1876 to 1911, took advantage of this improvement and encouraged US investment in order to shore up Mexico's stagnant economy. However, tensions re-emerged in 1911 after Diaz resigned, as Henry Lane Wilson, the US Ambassador to Mexico, worked to overthrow his successor, Francisco I. Madero, and replace him with General Victoriano Huerta, whom Ambassador Wilson viewed as better for American interests. The resulting coup d'etat took place in February 1913 and was known as La Decena Tragica.

After becoming president in March 1913, Woodrow Wilson withdrew U.S. recognition from the government of Victoriano Huerta and began encouraging the Great Powers to follow suit. The situation escalated more when Wilson imposed an arms embargo on Mexico in August 1913. A couple of months later, In October 1913, rebellions in the states of Chihuahua and Morelos led by Pancho Villa and Emiliano Zapata broke out after Huerta declared victory in a blatantly fraudulent election. The U.S. subsequently supplied Villa with munitions in order to defeat Huerta.

The Tampico Affair itself was set off when nine American sailors were arrested by the Mexican government for entering off-limit areas in Tampico, Tamaulipas. The unarmed sailors were arrested when they entered a fuel loading station. The sailors were released, but the U.S. naval commander Henry T. Mayo demanded an apology and a 21-gun salute. The apology was provided, but not the salute. In the end, the response from U.S. President Woodrow Wilson ordered the U.S. Navy to prepare for the occupation of the port of Veracruz. While awaiting authorization from the U.S. Congress to carry out such action, Wilson was alerted to a delivery of weapons for Victoriano Huerta, who had taken control of Mexico the previous year after a bloody coup d'état (and was eventually deposed on July 15, 1914), due to arrive in the port on April 21 aboard the German-registered cargo steamer SS Ypiranga. As a result, Wilson issued an immediate order to seize the port's customs office and confiscate the weaponry. The weapons had actually been sourced by John Wesley De Kay, an American financier and businessman with large investments in Mexico, and a Russian arms dealer from Puebla, Leon Rasst, not the German government, as newspapers reported at the time.

Part of the arms shipment to Mexico originated from the Remington Arms company in the United States. The arms and ammunition were to be shipped to Mexico via Odessa and Hamburg to skirt the American arms embargo. In Hamburg, De Kay added to the shipment. The landing of the arms was blocked at Veracruz, but they were discharged a few weeks later in Puerto Mexico, a port controlled by Huerta at the time.

Initial landing

On the morning of April 21, 1914, warships of the United States Atlantic Fleet under the command of Rear Admiral Frank Friday Fletcher, began preparations for the seizure of the Veracruz waterfront.  Fletcher's orders were to "Seize custom house. Do not permit war supplies to be delivered to Huerta government or any other party."  At 11:12 hrs, consul William Canada watched from the roof of the American Consulate as the first boatload of Marines left the auxiliary vessel .  Whaleboats carrying 502 Marines from the 2nd Advanced Base Regiment, 285 armed Navy sailors, known as "Bluejackets," from the battleship  and a provisional battalion composed of the Marine detachments from Florida and her sister ship  also began landing operations.  As planned earlier, American consul William W. Canada notified General Gustavo Maass that Americans were occupying the port and warned him to "cooperate with the naval forces in maintaining order."  Maass, however, was not permitted by Mexico City to surrender the port.

Maass ordered the Eighteenth Regiment, under the command of General Luis B. Becerril, to distribute rifles to the populace and to the prisoners in "La Galera" military prison, and then all to proceed to the dock area.  Maass also ordered the Nineteenth Regiment, under the command of General Francisco A. Figueroa, to take up positions on Pier Number Four.  Maass then radioed a dispatch to General Aurelio Blanquet, Minister of War in Mexico City, of the American invasion.  Blanquet ordered Maass to not resist, but to retreat to Tejería, six miles inland.  The landing party, under the command of William R. Rush reached Pier 4 at 11:20.  A large crowd of Mexican and American citizens gathered to watch the spectacle. The American invaders, under the command of Marine Lt. Col. Wendell C. Neville, proceeded to their objectives without resistance.  By 11:45, the rail terminal and cable station were occupied.

Commodore  encouraged cadets of the Veracruz Naval Academy to take up the defense of the port for themselves.

Battle of Veracruz

Three Navy rifle companies were instructed to capture the customs house, post, and telegraph offices, while the Marines went for the railroad terminal, roundhouse, and yard, the cable office and the power plant.

Arms were distributed to the population, who were largely untrained in the use of Mausers and had trouble finding the correct ammunition. In short, the defense of the city by its populace was hindered by the lack of central organization and a lack of adequate supplies. The defense of the city also included the release of the prisoners held at the "La Galera" military prison, not those at San Juan de Ulúa  (some of whom were political prisoners), who were later attended to by the U.S. Navy.

 
Although most of the regular troops retreated with Maass to Tejería, the liberated prisoners under the command of Lt. Col. Manuel Contreras, and some civilians, opposed the Americans as they made their way to the custom house.  At 11:57, the Mexicans fired upon the Americans as they reached the intersection of Independencia and Emparán.  The navy signalman on top of the Terminal Hotel, Capt. Rush's headquarters, was the first American casualty, and by the end of the day, 4 Americans were dead and 20 wounded.

At 1:30 PM, the Ypiranga was intercepted, and detained, before it could off load its cargo of weapons and ammunition.

On the night of April 21, Fletcher decided that he had no choice but to expand the initial operation to include the entire city, not just the waterfront.  At 8:00 AM the next day, he gave orders to take control of the entire city. 

At 8:35 PM, Capt. C.T. Vogelsang's San Francisco entered the harbor next to the Prairie and off loaded a landing party.  At 3 AM, Commander William A. Moffett's Chester offloaded 2 companies of marines and a company of seamen.  These were followed by men from the Minnesota and Hancock of Admiral Charles J. Badger's Atlantic Fleet, bringing the total American men ashore to more than 3000.

At 07:45 April 22, the advance began. The leathernecks adapted to street fighting, which was a novelty to them. The sailors were less adroit at this style of fighting. A regiment led by Navy Captain E. A. Anderson advanced on the Naval Academy in parade-ground formation, making his men easy targets for the partisans barricaded inside (the cadets had left Veracruz the night before, after suffering a few casualties
).

The city was secured by 11:00 AM, and by evening more than 6,000 troops were ashore.

That afternoon, the First Advanced Base Regiment, originally bound for Tampico, came ashore under the command of Colonel John A. Lejeune.

A small naval aviation detachment arrived aboard  on April 24 under the command of Henry C. Mustin. Two early aircraft assembled by Glenn Curtiss prior to formation of the Curtiss Aeroplane and Motor Company conducted aerial reconnaissance around Veracruz. This was the first operational use of naval aircraft and the first time U.S. aviators of any service were the target of ground fire. 

On April 26, Fletcher declared martial law, and started turning the occupation over to the American army under the command of General Frederick Funston. Nineteen American sailors and Marines were killed.

A third provisional regiment of Marines, assembled at Philadelphia, arrived on May 1 under the command of Colonel Littleton W. T. Waller, who assumed overall command of the brigade, by that time numbering some 3,141 officers and men. By then, the sailors and Marines of the Fleet had returned to their ships and an Army brigade had landed. Marines and soldiers continued to garrison the city until the U.S. withdrawal on November 23, which occurred after Argentina, Brazil, and Chile (the three ABC powers, the most powerful and wealthy countries in South America) were able to settle the issues between the two nations at the Niagara Falls peace conference.

Aftermath

 	
U.S. Army Brigadier General Frederick Funston was placed in control of the administration of the port. Assigned to his staff as an intelligence officer was a young Captain Douglas MacArthur.

Huerta was not able to respond to the US invasion due to his preoccupation with the Mexican revolution. He had to contend with numerous revolts across his country, the most notable of which were led in Chihuahua by Villa and in the state of Morelos by Emiliano Zapata. Venustiano Carranza, previously an ally of the federal government, also revolted against Huerta in Coahuila, the state where he was formerly governor. These rebellions eventually culminated in the Battle of Zacatecas on the 24th of June, 1914, where the Federal army lost 5,000 soldiers. The result was instrumental in bringing about Huerta's resignation.

The occupation still brought the two countries to the brink of war and worsened U.S.-Mexican relations for many years. Argentina, Brazil and Chile, who at the time were negotiating the ABC pact, a proposed economic and political treaty to prevent conflict in South America,  held the Niagara Falls peace conference in Niagara Falls, Ontario, Canada, on May 20 to avoid an all-out war over this incident and to prevent American hegemony over the region.  A plan was formed in June for the US troops to withdraw from Veracruz after General Huerta surrendered the reins of his government to a new regime and Mexico assured the United States that it would receive no indemnity for its losses in the recent chaotic events. Huerta soon afterwards left office and gave his government to Carranza.  Carranza, who was still quite unhappy with US troops occupying Veracruz, rejected the rest of the agreement.  In November 1914, after the Convention of Aguascalientes ended and Carranza failed to resolve his differences with revolutionary generals Pancho Villa and Emiliano Zapata, Carranza left office for a short period and handed control to Eulalio Gutiérrez Ortiz.

During this brief absence from power, however, Carranza still controlled Veracruz and Tamaulipas. After leaving Mexico City, Carranza fled to the state of Veracruz, made the city of Cordoba the capital of his regime and agreed to accept the rest of the terms of Niagara Falls peace plan.  The US troops officially departed on November 23. Despite their previous spat, diplomatic ties between the US and the Carranza regime greatly extended, following the departure of US troops from Veracruz,.

After the fighting ended, U.S. Secretary of the Navy Josephus Daniels ordered that fifty-six Medals of Honor be awarded to participants in this action, the most for any single action before or since. This amount was half as many as had been awarded for the Spanish–American War, and close to half the number that would be awarded during World War I and the Korean War. A critic claimed that the excess medals were awarded by lot. Major Smedley Butler, a recipient of one of the nine Medals of Honor awarded to Marines, later tried to return it, being incensed at this "unutterable foul perversion of Our Country's greatest gift" and claiming he had done nothing heroic. The Department of the Navy told him to not only keep it, but wear it.

The controversy surrounding the Veracruz Medals of Honor led to stricter standards for the awarding of the Medal of Honor and the establishment of lower ranking medals to recognize a wider range of accomplishments.

Mexico's Naval Lt. Azueta and a Naval Military School cadet, Cadet Midshipman Virgilio Uribe, who died during the fighting, are now part of the roll call of honor read by all branches of the Mexican Armed Forces in all military occasions, alongside the six Niños Héroes of the Military College (nowadays the Heroic Military Academy) who died in defense of the nation during the Battle of Chapultepec on September 13, 1847. As a result of the brave defense put up by the Naval School cadets and faculty, it has now become the Heroic Naval Military School of Mexico in their honor by virtue of a congressional resolution in 1949.

Political consequences
As an immediate reaction to the military invasion of Veracruz several anti-U.S revolts broke out in Mexico, Argentina, Chile, Costa Rica, Ecuador, Guatemala, and Uruguay. U.S. citizens were expelled from Mexican territory and some had to be accommodated in refugee campuses at New Orleans, Texas City, and San Diego. Even the British government was privately irritated, because they had previously agreed with Woodrow Wilson that the United States would not invade Mexico without prior warning. The military invasion of Veracruz was also a decisive factor in favor of keeping Mexico neutral in World War I. Mexico refused to participate with the United States in its military excursion in Europe and guaranteed German companies they could keep their operations open, especially in Mexico City. Nevertheless, the tension between the US and Mexico was great enough that the German government offered to help Mexico reconquer territory lost to the US in the Mexican American war in exchange for Mexican soldiers to help Germany in World War I. The Mexican government refused this offer.

U.S. President Woodrow Wilson considered another military invasion of Veracruz and Tampico in 1917–1918, so as to take control of Tehuantepec Isthmus and Tampico oil fields, but this time the new Mexican President Venustiano Carranza gave the order to destroy the oil fields in case the Marines tried to land there. As a scholar once wrote: "Carranza may not have fulfilled the social goals of the revolution, but he kept the gringos out of Mexico City".

See also

 Victoriano Huerta
 Mexican Revolution
 Tampico Affair
 Theodore C. Lyster, U.S. Army's Chief Health Officer in the conflict
 United States involvement in the Mexican Revolution
 Foreign interventions by the United States

Bibliography 
 Botte, M. Louis. Magazine L'Illustration, artícle "Les Américains au Mexique", 13 Juin 1914. (See Wikisource)
 Eisenhower, John S.D. (1993), Intervention! The United States and the Mexican Revolution, 1913–1917, New York: W. W. Norton & Company
 O'Shaughnessy, Edith, (1916), A Diplomat's Wife in Mexico, Harper & Brothers Publishers
 Quirk, Robert E. (1967). An Affair of Honor: Woodrow Wilson and the Occupation of Veracruz, W. W. Norton & Company.
 Sweetman, Jack (1968). The Landing at Veracruz: 1914. Annapolis, Md.: Naval Institute Press.

Footnotes

External links

 
 Gallery, Daniel V. (1968) Eight Bells. Paperback Library.
 Sweetman, Jack (1968). The Landing at Veracruz: 1914. Annapolis, MD: Naval Institute Press.
 Veterans Museum & Memorial Center (2003). Veterans Museum & Memorial Center, In Memoriam, United States Interventions in Mexico, 1914–1917. Retrieved December 28, 2005.
 President Wilson's Speech in Response to the Tampico Incident, U.S. Department of State, Papers Relating to Foreign Affairs, 1914, pp. 474–476. 
 The Tampico Affair and the Speech from Woodrow Wilson to the American People – from the PBS Special The Border, about life on the Mexico–United States border
 
 Sweetman, Jack (2014). "‘Take Veracruz at Once’", Naval History Volume 28, Number 2
 Woodbury, Ronald G. “Wilson y La Intervención de Veracruz: Análisis Historiográfico.” Historia Mexicana 17#2 (1967), pp. 263–92, online in Spanish.

1914 in Mexico
Battles involving Mexico
History of Mexico
Mexican Revolution
Military history of Mexico
Mexico–United States relations
20th-century military history of the United States
Conflicts in 1914
Banana Wars
American military occupations
Naval battles of the Mexican Revolution
United States Marine Corps in the 20th century
Veracruz
Veracruz
United States involvement in regime change